Emperor Mu of Jin (343 – July 10, 361), personal name Sima Dan, courtesy name Pengzi, was an emperor of the Eastern Jin Dynasty.  While he "reigned" 17 years, most of these years were as a child, with the actual power in such figures as his mother Empress Chu Suanzi, He Chong, his granduncle Sima Yu the Prince of Kuaiji, Yin Hao, and Huan Wen.  It was during his reign that Jin's territory temporarily expanded to its greatest extent since the fall of northern China to Han Zhao, as Huan destroyed Cheng Han and added its territory to Jin's, and Later Zhao's collapse allowed Jin to regain most of the territory south of the Yellow River.

Prior to reign
Sima Dan was born in 343, during the reign of his father Emperor Kang; his mother was Empress Chu Suanzi, Emperor Kang's wife.  He was his father's only son.  When he was only one year old in 344, Emperor Kang grew seriously ill.  His granduncles from his paternal grandmother's side, the key officials Yu Bing and Yu Yi, wanted to support his granduncle, a son of his great-grandfather Emperor Yuan, Sima Yu the Prince of Kuaiji, as the new emperor, but Emperor Kang accepted the advice of another key official, He Chong, and decided to pass the throne to Sima Dan despite his young age.  (He Chong had, two years earlier, given identical advice to Emperor Kang's older brother and predecessor Emperor Cheng (i.e., he should pass the throne to a son), advice which was not followed.)  He therefore created Sima Dan crown prince.  He died less than a month later, and Crown Prince Dan succeeded to the throne as Emperor Mu.

Under Empress Dowager Chu's regency

Due to Emperor Mu's young age, his mother Empress Dowager Chu became the ruling authority at court and served as regent, although she largely followed the advice of He Chong and Sima Yu the Prince of Kuaiji, who served as co-prime ministers.  (Sima Yu took that position after Empress Dowager Chu's father, Chu Pou, declined)  After He Chong's death in 346, his role was taken by Cai Mo.

In 345, after Yu Yi, who had served as the commander of military forces in the western provinces (roughly covering modern Hubei, Hunan, Guizhou, and Yunnan), died, the ambitious general Huan Wen (an uncle of Emperor Mu by marriage, having married his aunt Sima Xingnan the Princess Nankang) was put in charge of those provinces.  In late 346, Huan, despite a lack of approval from the central government, started a campaign to conquer Cheng Han, a rival state that possessed modern Sichuan and Chongqing.  In 347, Cheng Han fell to him, allowing Jin to control all of southern China.  From this point, however, Huan became effectively independent in his decision-making over the western provinces.  Sima Yu, in apprehension that Huan intended to take over the empire entirely, invited the renowned official Yin Hao to join him and Cai as a high-level official as well, intending to use Yin to counter Huan.

In 349, with rival Later Zhao in a state of disarray following the death of its emperor Shi Hu and the subsequent internecine warfare between his sons and his adopted grandson Shi Min, many of Later Zhao's southern provinces switched their allegiance to Jin, and Huan prepared a northern excursion.  Instead, the imperial government, under Sima Yu and Yin, sent Emperor Mu's grandfather Chu Pou.  Chu, however, withdrew after some initial failures, and the campaign resulted in the death of many civilians who were intending to defect to Jin.  (He died in distress soon thereafter)  Minor campaigns carried out by the general Sima Xun were also largely unsuccessful.

In 350, Yin himself prepared a campaign north, but failed to immediately carry out that campaign; instead, he seized even more power after accusing Cai, by repeatedly declining an honor conferred on him, was being disrespectful to the emperor, and reducing Cai to commoner status.  Meanwhile, Huan became impatient after his requests were being rebuffed by Sima Yu and Yin and, around the new year 352, Huan mobilized his troops and gestured as if he were about to attack the capital.  Yin was shocked, and initially considered either resigning or send the imperial banner of peace (Zouyu Fan, 騶虞幡) to order Huan to stop.  After advice from Wang Biaozhi, however, he instead asked Sima Yu to write a carefully worded letter to Huan, persuading Huan to stop.

Later in 352, Yin launched his own campaign, but upon the start of the campaign, former Later Zhao generals in control of Xuchang and Luoyang rebelled, and his venture had to halt to deal with these rebellions. Subsequently, when his assistants, the generals Xie Shang and Yao Xiang tried to attack Zhang Yu, the general in control of Xuchang, Former Qin forces came to Zhang's aid and defeated Xie's troops. Yin then abandoned the campaign entirely.

In fall 352, Yin prepared a second campaign. Initially the campaign had some success, recovering Xuchang from Former Qin. However, Yin became suspicious of Yao's military capabilities and independence, and therefore tried to assassinate Yao. Yao discovered this, and, as Yin headed north, he ambushed Yin's troops, inflicting heavy losses on Yin. Yao then took over the Shouchun region. The people despised Yin for his military losses, and Huan submitted a petition demanding Yin's ouster. The imperial government was compelled to demote Yin to commoner status and exile him.  From that point on, the imperial government was under Sima Yu alone, although it was forced to yield to Huan much of the decision-making power.

In 354, Huan launched a major campaign against Former Qin, but after advancing all the way to the vicinity of Former Qin's capital Chang'an, hesitated on further advancements, and he eventually ran out of food supplies and was forced to withdraw.

In 356, Huan proposed that the capital be moved back to Luoyang (where it had been until its fall to Han Zhao in 311), but his proposal was rejected.  He then carried out a campaign against Yao, who was largely in control of the region at the time.  He dealt Yao some severe losses, and Yao eventually tried to advance west and was defeated and killed by Former Qin.  Once again in control of the Luoyang region, Huan reproposed his idea to move the capital back to Luoyang, but the imperial government again declined.  Later that year, the Jin vassal Duan Kan, who was in control of modern Shandong as the Duke of Qi, was defeated by Former Yan's general Murong Ke, and his domain was seized by Former Yan.

In spring 357, as Emperor Mu had his rite of passage (at age 13), Empress Dowager Chu terminated her own regency, and from that point on, Emperor Mu became officially the decision maker, although effectively, Sima Yu and Huan Wen continued to make the decisions.

As "adult" emperor
In September 357, Emperor Mu married He Fani as his empress.

In 358, Sima Yu offered to resign all of his powers, but Emperor Mu declined.  Later that year, a northern campaign by the general Xun Xian, intending to recapture the Shandong Peninsula, failed.

In 359, with Former Yan exerting pressure on Jin possessions south of the Yellow River, the generals Xie Wan, Zhuge You, and Chi Tan advanced north to attack Former Yan, but the forces collapsed after Xie wrongly believed that Former Yan forces were near and ordered a retreat.  Without aid, Jin possessions south of the Yellow River began to fall into Former Yan hands.

In July 361, Emperor Mu died without a son.  Empress Dowager Chu therefore ordered that his cousin, Sima Pi the Prince of Langya, be made emperor.  Sima Pi then succeeded to the throne as Emperor Ai.

Era names
 Yonghe (永和, py. Yǒnghé): 21 February 345 – 5 February 357
 Shengping (升平, py. Shēngpíng): 6 February 357 – 2 March 362

Family
Consorts:
 Empress Muzhang, of the He clan of Lujiang (339–404), personal name Fani

Ancestry

References

343 births
361 deaths
Jin dynasty (266–420) emperors
4th-century Chinese monarchs